Augustine John de Clare Studdert (31 January 1901 – 20 March 1972) was an Anglican priest, most notably Archdeacon of Surrey from 1957 to 1968.

Studdert was educated at Trinity College, Dublin and ordained in 1926. He served curacies at Glendermott and St Martin-in-the-Fields. Assistant Chaplain to the British Embassy Church in Paris. He was Rector of Busbridge from 1939 to 1969;
Rural Dean of Godalming from 1950 to 1957; and Examining Chaplain to the Bishop of Guildford from 1961 to 1969.

References

1972 deaths
1901 births
Alumni of Trinity College Dublin
Archdeacons of Surrey